The Monticello Historic District is a U.S. Historic District (designated as such on August 19, 1977) located in Monticello, Florida. The district includes an irregular area along Madison, Jefferson, Dogwood, and Washington Streets and contains 41 historic buildings.

Contributing properties in the district include:
 Christ Episcopal Church (Monticello, Florida)
 Jefferson County Courthouse (Florida)

References

National Register of Historic Places in Jefferson County, Florida
Historic districts on the National Register of Historic Places in Florida
Vernacular architecture in Florida
Monticello, Florida